Michael Gregory Helton (born August 30, 1953) is an American businessman, and the Vice Chairman of the National Association for Stock Car Auto Racing (NASCAR). He replaced Bill France Jr. in November 2000 as the company's 3rd president. He was named Chief Operating Officer of NASCAR in February 1999.

Early life
Helton is from Bristol, Virginia. After graduating from John S. Battle High School in Washington County, Virginia, where he was senior class president, he attended King College in Bristol, Tennessee, home of Bristol Motor Speedway.  He majored in accounting and minored in math displaying an aptitude for numbers. He was awarded an Honorary Degree from King College in May 2000.

Following college, Helton worked as an accountant plus supplemented his income by refereeing football and basketball.  A fellow referee introduced him to a small local AM radio station where he became the station's sports director. One of Helton's favorite assignments as sports director in the mid-1970s were the frequent NASCAR events in his area. By 1980, Helton became a public relations director at Atlanta Motor Speedway.

Career

In 1980, Helton began at Atlanta International Raceway and was promoted to general manager in 1985. He joined the management team at Daytona International Speedway in 1986. After eighteen months, Helton became the general manager at Talladega Superspeedway. He became vice president of International Speedway Corporation in two years and was promoted to president of the Talladega track in 1989. Helton held that position until January 1994, when he became the new vice president for competition for NASCAR taking over for Les Richter.

Helton was named senior vice president and chief operating officer, in February 1999, and became the first person outside the France family to manage NASCAR's day-to-day operations.  A year later, Helton was named President of NASCAR and sits on its five-member board of directors.

NASCAR signed a new network television deal near the end of 1999. NASCAR's premiere event, the Daytona 500, was the first race broadcast under that deal in 2001 but was marred by Dale Earnhardt Sr.'s death on its final lap. Helton's announcement after the race was nationally televised, "This is undoubtedly one of the toughest announcements that I've ever personally had to make but after the accident in turn 4 at the end of the Daytona 500, we've lost Dale Earnhardt."  Following Earnhardt's death, NASCAR began a seven-year design program to develop the Car of Tomorrow. This effort was championed by Helton to increase driver safety and was implemented for the 2008 season.

On race day Helton occupies an observation point referred to as "control" where he and NASCAR officials observe the events. On February 10, 2015, Helton was named Vice Chairman of NASCAR by NASCAR Chairman Brian France. Helton remained the senior NASCAR official at all national series racing events overseeing competition, and he remains a member of the board of directors.

In October 25, 2015 Helton contributed to pre-post race coverage that weekend from Talladega as a fill in for Dale Jarrett with Krista Voda and Kyle Petty.

References

External links
Interview with Helton

Auto racing executives
Living people
American motorsport people
NASCAR people
People from Bristol, Virginia
1953 births
American chief operating officers